24 Hours in the Life of a Woman is a 1944 Argentine drama film directed by Carlos F. Borcosque and starring Amelia Bence and Roberto Escalada. It is based on the 1927 novel Twenty-Four Hours in the Life of a Woman by Stefan Zweig. Mario Fezia won the Silver Condor Award for Best Sound for the film.

Cast
Amelia Bence		
Roberto Escalada		
Olga Casares Pearson		
Bernardo Perrone		
Federico Mansilla		
Julio Renato		
Gloria Ferrandiz		
Dario Cossier		
Alba Castellanos		
Ada Cornaro		
Francisco de Paula		
Baby Correa		
José Antonio Paonessa		
Herminia Mas		
Francisco Bastardi

References

External links
 

1944 films
1940s Spanish-language films
Argentine black-and-white films
Films based on works by Stefan Zweig
Argentine drama films
1944 drama films
1940s Argentine films